Richard Stapleton (died 31 July 1949) was an Irish Labour Party politician. He was elected to Dáil Éireann as a Labour Party Teachta Dála (TD) for the Tipperary constituency at the 1943 general election. He lost his seat at the 1944 general election.

References

Year of birth missing
1949 deaths
Labour Party (Ireland) TDs
Members of the 11th Dáil
Politicians from County Tipperary